The Niagara 26 is a Canadian sailboat that was designed by George Hinterhoeller and first built in 1975.

Production
The type was initially built by Hinterhoeller Yachts in Niagara Falls, Ontario, Canada as one of the first designs after Hinterhoeller had left C&C Yachts to re-establish his own company. After the first 69 boats had been built by Hinterhoeller, licensed production moved to two other Canadian companies, Goman Boat Limited and the Halman Manufacturing Company. A total of 170 boats were completed before production ended.

Design
The Niagara 26 is a recreational keelboat, built predominantly of fibreglass, with wood trim. It has a fractional sloop rig, a raked stem, a plumb transom, a transom-hung rudder controlled by a tiller and a fixed fin keel. It displaces  and carries  of ballast. The boat can also be equipped with a spinnaker.

The boat can be fitted with an inboard engine or an outboard motor for docking and manoeuvring.

See also

List of sailing boat types

Similar sailboats
Beneteau First 26
C&C 26
C&C 26 Wave
Contessa 26
Dawson 26
Discovery 7.9
Grampian 26
Herreshoff H-26
Hunter 26
Hunter 26.5
Hunter 260
Hunter 270
Mirage 26
Nash 26
Nonsuch 26
Outlaw 26
Paceship PY 26
Pearson 26
Parker Dawson 26
Sandstream 26
Tanzer 26
Yamaha 26

References

External links

Keelboats
1970s sailboat type designs
Sailing yachts
Sailboat type designs by George Hinterhoeller
Sailboat types built by Hinterhoeller Yachts
Sailboat types built by Goman Boat Limited
Sailboat types built by Halman Manufacturing